Tess Kirsopp-Cole (born 2 December 1999) is an Australian athlete who in 2022 won the Oceania title in 800m and represented her country at the 2022 World Athletics Championships.

Career
From Winchelsea South, Victoria, as a junior Kirsopp-Cole competed as a sprinter and won state titles in 100m, 200m, and 400m races and became the national U17 champion in 400 metres. She also competed in equestrian events including dressage, show jumping and eventing. Unfortunately for her, she had a succession of health setbacks including a long process culminating in a diagnosis of Endometriosis in 2021, and brain injuries suffered as a result from a fall from a horse. Kirsopp-Cole came back to fitness and won the 800 metres race at the 2022 Oceania Championships, and competed for her country at the 2022 World Athletics Championships held in Eugene, Oregon.

References

Living people
1999 births
Australian female sprinters
Sportswomen from Victoria (Australia)
World Athletics Championships athletes for Australia
20th-century Australian women
21st-century Australian women